A foe is a unit of energy equal to 1044 joules or 1051 ergs, used to express the large amount of energy released by a supernova.  An acronym for "[ten to the power of] fifty-one ergs", the term was introduced by Gerald E. Brown of Stony Brook University in his work with Hans Bethe, because "it came up often enough in our work". 

Without mentioning the foe, Steven Weinberg proposed in 2006 "a new unit called the bethe" (B) with the same value, to "replace" it.

This unit of measure is convenient because a supernova typically releases about one foe of observable energy in a very short period (which can be measured in seconds). In comparison, if the Sun's current luminosity is the same as its average luminosity over its lifetime, it would release 3.827 W × 3.1536 s/yr × 1010 yr ≈ 1.2 foe. One solar mass has a rest mass energy of 1787 foe.

See also
 Orders of magnitude (energy)

References

Units of energy
Supernovae